The Comcast Technology Center is a supertall skyscraper in Center City, Philadelphia. The tower is located on the southwest corner of 18th and Arch Streets, one block west of the Comcast Center, the headquarters of Comcast Corporation. A hotel—the highest in the country—and restaurant are located on the top floors, while central floors contain offices for Comcast software developers and engineers, and the lowest floors have television studios and retail stores.

Construction began in mid-2014 and topped out on November 27, 2017. The first personnel began moving into the building in late July 2018 and the tower was open to the public in October of that year.

Design and construction
The lead architect was Foster and Partners, with Kendall/Heaton Associates the collaborating architect, and interior design by Gensler with Foster and Partners in collaboration. The L.F. Driscoll Company was the construction contractor. The tower contains approximately 1.566 million rentable square feet, including 1.334 million rentable square feet of office space, 230,112 square feet of hotel space, and 2,682 rentable square feet of retail space.

A set of five tuned sloshing dampers containing 125,000 gallons of water are located in the ceiling of the 57th floor, beneath the hotel lobby. The moving water is a counteracting force on windy days to reduce swaying of the upper part of the tower. A-shaped steel braces are embedded between hotel rooms on the east and west sides, to stiffen the upper part of the building against strong, prevailing winds.

Use

The building consists primarily of workspace for Comcast employees and the Four Seasons Hotel, formerly on Logan Circle. The hotel is on the 48th to 56th floors with a lobby and restaurant on the 60th floor. Accommodations include 219 rooms, 39 of them suites. The building also includes television studios, restaurants, a retail mall, and a parking garage. The property is co-owned by Comcast and Liberty Property Trust, and had an estimated construction cost of $1.5 billion.

Comcast's NBC owned-and-operated station WCAU (channel 10), along with Telemundo's owned-and-operated station WWSI (channel 62) announced plans to move their studio operations and offices from City Avenue, the Philadelphia-Bala Cynwyd boundary, to several of the lower floors of the building. The stations completed the on-air move on October 21, 2018, though some operations (such as the base for the station live vehicles) will remain in Bala Cynwyd for the time being.

Gallery

See also
 List of tallest buildings in Philadelphia
 List of tallest buildings in Pennsylvania
 List of tallest buildings in the United States
 List of tallest buildings

References

External links

 Comcast press release
 NBC Philadelphia's construction webcam

Center
Postmodern architecture in Pennsylvania
National Broadcasting Company
NBC buildings
NBCUniversal
Television studios in the United States
Modernist architecture in Pennsylvania
Skyscraper office buildings in Philadelphia
Telecommunications company headquarters in the United States
Office buildings completed in 2018
2018 establishments in Pennsylvania